The East Lancs E Type is a type of double-deck bus body built on different chassis by East Lancashire Coachbuilders.

Chassis
Types bodied include the following:
 Dennis Dominator
 Dennis Arrow
 Leyland Olympian
 Scania N113DRB
 Volvo B10M
 Volvo Olympian

Description
The E Type bears a strong visual resemblance to the Alexander R Type. East Lancs first built bodies resembling the R Type in 1984, which were almost identical in appearance to the Alexander product. Later examples had more East Lancs styling elements, making identification easier.

The E Type was superseded by the Cityzen on Scania N113DRB around 1996 and the Pyoneer on other chassis around 1997.

See also 

 List of buses

Double-decker buses
E Type